Araecerus is a genus of beetles belonging to the family Anthribidae.

Species
A. coffeae (Fabricius, 1801)(now considered a junior synonym of A. fasciculatus) 
A. constans Perkins, 1900
A. cumingi (Jekel, 1855)
A. fasciculatus (De Geer, 1775)
A. levipennis Jordan, 1924
A. varians Jordan, 1946
A. vieillardi (Montrouzier, 1860)

References 

 
Weevil genera